Pavel Šultes (born 15 September 1985) is a Czech football forward who plays for SK Černolice.

Career

Club
With nine goals in the 2009–10 season of Gambrinus liga, he became one of the best goalscorers of the league.

In June 2011, he joined Polish club Polonia Warsaw on a three-year contract.

In June 2012, he joined Polish club Ruch Chorzów.

References

External links
 
 

1985 births
Living people
Czech footballers
SK Sigma Olomouc players
SFC Opava players
1. FC Slovácko players
Polonia Warsaw players
Ruch Chorzów players
FK Mladá Boleslav players
FC Hradec Králové players
FC Akzhayik players
Czech First League players
Ekstraklasa players
Czech expatriate footballers
Czech expatriate sportspeople in Poland
Expatriate footballers in Poland
Expatriate footballers in Kazakhstan
Expatriate footballers in Austria
People from Valtice
Association football forwards
Sportspeople from the South Moravian Region